Warnung is a rural locality in the South Burnett Region, Queensland, Australia. In the  Warnung had a population of 11 people.

History 
The locality's name came from the Warnung railway station, which was named by the Queensland Railways Department on 18 March 1924. It is an Aboriginal word referring to a species of Eucalyptus known as box trees.

The Warnung railway station was on the Windera railway line, now closed.

In the  Warnung had a population of 11 people.

References 

South Burnett Region
Localities in Queensland